At the Green Cockatoo by Night is a 1957 West German musical film directed by Georg Jacoby and starring Marika Rökk, Dieter Borsche and Renate Ewert.

It was made by Real Film at the Wandsbek Studios in Hamburg.

Cast
Marika Rökk as Irene Wagner
Dieter Borsche as Dr. Maybach
Renate Ewert as Hilde Wagner
Gunnar Möller as Knut Peters
Hans Nielsen as Eduard Reichmann
Loni Heuser as Tante Henriette
Willy Maertens as Onkel Otto
Trude Hesterberg as Frl. Koldewey
Fred Raul as Haase
Ludwig Linkmann as Prof. Hagedorn
Joseph Offenbach as Balduin
Christa Williams as singer
Frank Forster as singer
Helmut Ketels as dancer
Claus Christofolini as dancer
Heinz Holl as dancer

References

External links

West German films
German musical comedy films
1957 musical comedy films
Films directed by Georg Jacoby
Real Film films
Films shot at Wandsbek Studios
1950s German films
1950s German-language films